Nachalnik Kamchatki is the third album of the Soviet rock band Kino. The name of the album is a play on the title of the 1967 Soviet film Chief of Chukotka.

The album was recorded on a multitrack tape recorder in the AnTrop studio. Andrei Tropillo supervised and engineered the recording. Musicians from Aquarium and the AnTrop studio collective played alongside Kino. The album was initially released in 1984 and distributed as magnitizdat.

A review of the album appeared in issue 7 of the rock samizdat journal, Roksi.

Track listing
"Последний герой" (Last Hero)
"Каждую ночь" (Every Night)
"Транквилизатор" (Tranquilizer)
"Сюжет для новой песни" (Theme for a New Song)
"Гость" (Guest)
"Камчатка" (Kamchatka)
"Ария мистера Х" (The Aria of Mr. X) (from Emmerich Kalman's operetta The Circus Princess)
"Троллейбус" (Trolleybus)
"Растопите снег" (Melt Down the Snow)
"Дождь для нас" (Rain for Us)
"Хочу быть с тобой" (Want to Be with You)
"Генерал" (General)
"Прогулка романтика" (Walk of a Romantic)

Personnel
Viktor Tsoi – vocals, guitar
Yuri Kasparyan – guitar
Alexander Titov – bass guitar, percussion
Boris Grebenshchikov – drum machine, Casio PT-1

Additional personnel
Sergey Kuryokhin – keyboards
Petr Troshchenkov – percussion
Vsevolod Gakkel' – cello, drums
Georgy Guryanov – percussion
Igor Butman – saxophone

References

External links 

 Nachalnik Kamchatki on Discogs

Soviet rock music
Kino (band) albums
1984 albums
1984 in the Soviet Union